Field & Stream (F&S for short) is an American online magazine focusing on hunting, fishing and other outdoor activities. The magazine was a print publication between 1895 and 2015 and became an online-only publication from 2020.

History and profile
Founded in 1895 by John P. Burkhard and Henry Wellington Wack, Field & Stream at one time had  more than one million print subscribers, with a significant following online, as well. Depending on the season and the availability of information, the magazine may offer advice on bass, birds, deer, trout, rifles, and shotguns. The magazine also offers tricks, survival tips, miscellaneous facts, and wild game recipes. 

In addition to those departments, each issue contains longform featured articles, for which it is renowned. 

Warren H. Miller was its managing editor from 1910 to 1918. The magazine absorbed its chief competitor, Forest and Stream, in 1930. Henry Holt and Company purchased the magazine in 1951. The company published the magazine on a monthly basis in New York City. Holt eventually ended up being owned by CBS, which sold their magazines in a leveraged buyout, led by division head Peter Diamandis, to the Times-Mirror Company, which in turn sold their magazines to Time Inc. in 2001. Sid Evans was brought in to replace Slaton White, who remained on staff, as editor.

Field & Stream was one of 18 magazines sold to Bonnier Group in February 2007. That year, after a five-year tenure that had an editorial revival of the publication, Evans left to helm Garden & Gun magazine, in Charleston, South Carolina, along with then editor of Saltwater Sportsman and former F&S features editor David DiBenedetto. 

Anthony Licata was then appointed editor, and under Licata, the magazine won two coveted National Magazine Awards for General Excellence, in 2009 and 2014.

The magazine's current contributors include C. J. Chivers, Jonathan Miles, Bill Heavey, T. Edward Nickens, Phil Bourjaily, Rick Bass, J.R. Sullivan, Keith McCafferty, and David E. Petzal. Notable past contributors include Robert Ruark, Ted Trueblood, Ed Zern, Nick Lyons, Tom Kelly, Thomas McGuane, Gene Hill, and Jim Harrison. 

The magazine is currently edited by Colin Kearns, who was promoted from senior deputy editor in the end of 2016.

In January 2017, owing to financial difficulties at Bonnier Corporation, the magazine's publishing frequency was scaled back from nine issues a year to six, and several longtime members of the editorial staff were let go, in a "blood bath" of cuts, according to the New York Post. In October 2021, Bonnier Corp. sold Field & Stream, along with its sister title, Outdoor Life, to North Equity, a venture equity firm that alleges to scale "transformative digital media brands". The magazine's commemorative 125th-anniversary issue was its last print edition. As of March 2021, the magazine remains a web-only publication.

Trademark
While Field & Stream magazine now belongs to Bonnier, the right to use the Field & Stream name on goods and services belongs to a private investment group unrelated to Bonnier or the magazine, while Dick's Sporting Goods owns the rights to the name for the retail stores Field & Stream.

See also
Corey Ford
 Outside

References

External links
 
 Field & Stream at the Online Books Page

Bonnier Group
Hunting and fishing magazines
Magazines established in 1895
Magazines disestablished in 2015
Magazines published in New York City
Monthly magazines published in the United States
Nine times annually magazines
Online magazines with defunct print editions
Sports magazines published in the United States